The ABC Under-18 Championship 1996 is the 14th edition of the ABC's junior championship for basketball. The games were held at Johor Bahru, Malaysia from September 1–10, 1996.

Preliminary round

Group A

Group B

Group C

Group D

Quarterfinal round

Group I

Group II

Group III

Group IV

Classification 5th–14th

13th place

11th place

9th place

7th place

5th place

Final round

Semifinals

3rd place

Final

Final standing

Awards

All-Star Team:

  Wang Zhizhi
  Jin Lipeng
  Yasseen Ismail
  Takuma Watanabe
  Jun Hyung-Soo

References
 FIBA Archive

FIBA Asia Under-18 Championship
1996–97 in Asian basketball
International basketball competitions hosted by Malaysia
1996 in Malaysian sport
September 1996 sports events in Asia